Sullivan County International Airport  is in Bethel, Sullivan County, New York. It is seven miles northwest of Monticello, a village in the Town of Thompson. The National Plan of Integrated Airport Systems for 2011–2015 categorized it as a general aviation facility.

Built in the 1960s, the airport is now a Part 139 certified airport capable of handling business jets.

Facilities
The airport covers 600 acres (243 ha) at an elevation of 1,403 feet (428 m). Its runway, 15/33, is 6,298 by 150 feet (1,920 x 46 m) asphalt.

In the year ending October 31, 2011 the airport had 28,650 aircraft operations, average 78 per day: 99% general aviation and 1% air taxi. 41 aircraft were then based at the airport: 78% single-engine, 10% multi-engine, 7% jet, and 5% helicopter.

References

External links 
 Sullivan County International (MSV) at NYSDOT Airport Directory
 Aerial image as of May 1997 from USGS The National Map via MSR Maps
 

Airports in New York (state)
Transportation buildings and structures in Sullivan County, New York